Gordon Ross may refer to:

 Gordon Ross (rugby union) (born 1978), British rugby union footballer
 Gordon Ross (writer) (1918–1985), British sports writer
 J. Gordon Ross (1891–1972), Canadian member of Parliament
 Gordon Ross (Australian footballer) (1878–1952), Australian rules footballer for Carlton

See also
 Gordon Ross-Soden (1888–1931), Australian rules footballer for Essendon